Cléber António de Oliveira (born July 9, 1983), or simply Clebão or Cléber, is a Brazilian football player who is currently playing for América de Natal.

Club career

Brazil
After a brief stay with Santos FC, Clebão started his career with São Paulo state club Sãocarlense. In 2004, he moved to Campeonato Mineiro club Caldense. After one season with the club he moved to São Carlos and helped his new club capture the 2005 Campeonato Paulista Segunda Divisão.

China
In February 2007, Clebão was loaned out to China League One side Guangzhou Pharmaceutical for one season. He helped Guangzhou win the first place of China League One and promotion to the China Super League.

Return to Brazil
Following his loan stint in China he returned to São Carlos. His play with São Carlos led to interest from Campeonato Paulista Série A2 side União São João which took him on loan during the 2008 season. 
While with São Carlos Clebão appeared in 63 matches (fourth most appearances with the club) and scored 6 goals.

Europe
Following the 2009 season Clebão started to receive offers from European clubs including Portugal's C.F. Os Belenenses and was reportedly close to signing with recently promoted 2. Fußball-Bundesliga side FC Union Berlin. After the move fell through,
he transferred to C.D. Nacional of the Portuguese Liga in August 2009 and  made his debut for Nacional against Sporting CP on 15 August playing the full 90 in a 1–1 draw. During his time with Nacional he appeared in seven league matches and featured in one Europa League match.

Honours
 São Carlos Futebol Clube
Campeonato Paulista Segunda Divisão (Série B): 2005
 Guangzhou Evergrande
China League One: 2007

References

External links
 
 footmercato.net
 
 Statistics with Nacional

1983 births
Living people
Brazilian footballers
Brazilian expatriate footballers
Brasiliense Futebol Clube players
Primeira Liga players
Expatriate footballers in Portugal
Expatriate footballers in China
C.D. Nacional players
Guangzhou F.C. players
China League One players
Brazilian expatriate sportspeople in China
América Futebol Clube (RN) players
Ceará Sporting Club players
Association football defenders